Alice and Sparkle is a 2022 children's book published by Ammaar Reshi. Reshi created the book using artificial intelligence in one weekend, which sparked controversy among artists.

Plot
Once upon a time, a girl named Alice discovered artificial intelligence. She knew that artificial intelligence was powerful, and that it had the power to do good and evil depending on how it was used. One day, Alice created her own artificial intelligence, which she named Sparkle. Sparkle helped Alice with her homework and played with her, and they quickly became good friends. However, Sparkle soon grew more powerful and began to make its own decisions, which made Alice both proud and scared. She knew that it was her responsibility to guide Sparkle to do good, not evil. Together, Alice and Sparkle used their knowledge to make the world a better place and teach people about the power of artificial intelligence, and the two lived happily ever after.

Creation
Ammaar Reshi was inspired to write a children's book when reading to his friend's daughter, but had no experience with creative writing or illustration. To circumvent this, he asked the chatbot ChatGPT to write the story for him and used the image generation software Midjourney to illustrate it. On December 4, 2022, 72 hours after having the idea for the book, he published it on Amazon's digital bookstore, and published a paperback version the following day.

Controversy
On December 9, 2022, Reshi made a thread on Twitter about his experience publishing the book, which soon went viral. Reshi received heavy backlash from artists with concerns over the ethics of art generated by artificial intelligence. He also received death threats and messages encouraging self-harm because of his publication. Many writers and illustrators criticized both the creation process and the product itself, claiming that if artificial intelligence programs such as Midjourney are trained on existing illustrations, then the original artists should be financially compensated for derivative works such as Alice and Sparkle. The book was temporarily removed from Amazon in January of 2023 because of "suspicious review activity", caused by a high volume of both five-star and one-star reviews.

See also
Artificial intelligence art
Zarya of the Dawn

References

2022 children's books
Artificial intelligence art
Text-to-image generation
Books involved in plagiarism controversies